The 13th edition of the Tanzania Music Awards took place at the Mlimani City Conference Center in Dar es Salaam, on Saturday 14 April 2012. The event was anchored by Vanessa Mdee and Millard Ayo. The nominees were announced on 8 February 2012 with Bongo Flava artist Diamond Platnumz topping the list with seven nominations. Two days after the list was released, four-time nominee Dully Sykes announced his withdrawal from the event. He stated 'it does not contribute to my growth whatsoever, and this contest is full of lies'. After leaving the 2011 Tanzania Music Awards empty-handed, Diamond Platnumz made a return by winning three awards, including Best Male Artist and Best Video.

Nominees and winners
Winners are in bold text.

Best Male Artist
Diamond Platnumz
Ali Kiba
Bob Junior
Dully Sykes
Mzee Yusuf

Best Female Artist
Khadija Kopa
Dayna
Isha Mashauzi
Queen Darleen
Shaa

Best Male Singer
Barnaba Classic
Ali Kiba
Belle 9
Diamond Platnumz
Mzee Yusuf

Best Female Singer
Lady Jaydee
Dayna
Isha Mashauzi
Khadija Kopa
Linah

Best Song Writer
Diamond Platnumz
Ali Kiba
Barnaba Classic
Belle 9
Mzee Yusuf

Best Upcoming Artist
Ommy Dimpoz
Abdu Kiba
Beatrice Nabisha
Darassa
Recho

Best Hip Hop Artist
Roma
Fid Q
Godzilla
Izzo B
Joh Makini

Best Rapper (from a Band)
Kalijo Kitokololo
Ferguson
Khalid Chokoraa
Msafiri Diouf
Toto ze Bingwa

Best Song
Suma Lee - 'Hakunaga'
Ali Kiba - 'Dushelele'
Belle 9 - 'Nilipe Nisepe'
Diamond Platnumz - 'Moyo Wangu'
Izzo B - 'Riz One'
Roma - 'Mathematics'

Best Video
Diamond Platnumz - 'Moyo Wangu'
Dully Sykes - 'Bongo flava'
Kassim Mganga feat Mr Blue - 'Ndoa ndoana'
Lady Jamra feat Mr Blue - 'Wangu'
Suma Lee - 'Hakunaga'

Best Afro Pop Song
Suma Lee - 'Hakunaga'
Diamond Platnumz - 'Mawazo'
Diamond Platnumz - 'Moyo Wangu'
Dully Sykes - 'Bongo flava'
Ommy Dimpoz ft Ali Kiba- 'Nai Nai'

Best R&B Song
Ben Pol - 'My Number One Fan'
Ben Pol ft One - 'Maumivu'
Belle 9 - 'Nilipe Nisepe'
Hemed - 'Usiniache'
Jux - 'Napata Raha'

Best Zouk/Rhumba Song
Ali Kiba - 'Dushelele'
Barnaba - 'Daima milele'
Dayna & Barnaba - 'Nivute kwako'
Lady Jaydee feat Mr Blue - 'Wangu'
Recho - 'Kizungu zungu'

Best Hip Hop Song
 Roma - 'Mathematics'
Godzilla ft Marco Chali - 'King Zila'
Izzo B - 'Riz One'
Jay Mo ft P-Funk Majani - 'Famous'
Joh Makini ft Lady Jaydee, G Nako - 'Kilimanjaro'

Best Collaboration Song
Ommy Dimpoz ft Ali Kiba- 'Nai Nai'
Chege, Temba & Ferouz - 'Kama ni gangstar'
Godzilla feat Marco Chali - 'King zilla'
Jay Mo feat ft P-Funk Majani - 'Famous'
Lady Jaydee feat Mr Blue - 'Wangu'

Best Swahili Song (from a Band)
African Stars - 'Dunia Daraja'
Extra Bongo - 'Falsafa ya Mapenzi
Extra Bongo - 'Mtenda'
Mashujaa Band - 'Hukumu ya Mnafiki'
Mapacha Watatu - 'Usia wa Babu'

Best Ragga/Dancehall Song
Queen Darleen ft Dully Sykes - 'Maneno Maneno'
AY feat Ms. Triniti - 'Good look'
Dabo - 'Ganja man'
Malfred - 'Kudadeki'
Malfred - 'Poyoyo'

Best Reggae Song
Warrior from the East - 'Arusha Gold'
20 Percent - 'Ni yao'
Delyla princess - 'Give it up to me'
Nakaaya - 'Ni wewe'
Malfred feat Lutan Fyah - 'Mazingira'

Best Taarab Song
Isha Mashauzi - 'Nani Kama Mama'
Isha Mashauzi - 'Mamaa Mashauzi'
Jahazi Modern Taarab - 'Hakuna Mkamilifu'
Jahazi Modern Taarab - 'Nilijua Mtasema'
Khadija Kopa - 'Full Stop'

Best East African Song
 Jaguar - 'Kigeugeu''
 Avril & Marya - 'Chokoza'
 Jose Chameleon - 'Valuvalu'
 Nameless - 'Coming home'
 /  Kidum & Sana  - 'Mulika mwizi'
 Prezzo - '4sho 4 shizzle'

Best Traditional Song
AT & Mwanne - 'Vifuu Utundu'
Ashimba - 'Mwanadamu'
AT - 'Bao la Kete'
Young D, Kitokololo & Mataluma - 'Tunapeta'
Offside Trick & Baby J - 'Kidudu Mtu'

Best Producer
Maneke (AM Records)
Bob Junior
Man Walter
Marco Chali
Pancho Latino

Hall of Fame trophy
to an individual: Remmy Ongala
to an institution: JKT

See also
Tanzania Music Awards
Music of Tanzania

References

External links
Tanzania Music Awards Official website

2012 music awards
2012 in Tanzania